George Small may refer to:

 George Small (American football) (born 1956), American football coach and former player
 George Small (musician), musician, composer and producer
 George Small (piano maker) (1782–1861), Scottish piano maker, music publisher and philanthropist